Adams Crest is the summit,  high, of an irregular V-shaped mountain  east of Saburro Peak in the Ravens Mountains, Britannia Range in Antarctica. Named after Colonel Jonathan E. Adams who served as Commander of the 109 Airlift Wing during the transition of LC-130 operations from the U.S. Navy to the Air National Guard.

Mountains of Oates Land